John Glatt is a British American author of biographies and true crime books. Glatt was born in London and moved to New York in 1981.

Bibliography
 Rage and Roll: Bill Graham and the Selling of Rock, Carol Publishing Corporation, 1993
 Lost in Hollywood: The Fast Times and Short Life of River Phoenix, St. Martin's Press, 1995
 The Chieftains: The Authorized Biography, St. Martin's Press, 1997
 For I Have Sinned, St. Martin's Press, 1998
 The Royal House of Monaco, St. Martin's Press, 1998
 Evil Twins, St. Martin's Press, 1999
 Blind Passion, St. Martin's Press, 2000 about the murder of Julia Scully by her husband George Skiadopoulos.
 Cradle of Death, St. Martin's Press, 2000 about Marie Noe
 Internet Slave Master, St. Martin's Press, 2001 about John Edward Robinson
 Cries in the Desert, St. Martin's Press, 2002 about David Parker Ray
 Twisted, St. Martin's Press, 2003 about Dr. Richard Sharpe.
 Deadly American Beauty, St. Martin's Press, 2004 about Kristin Rossum who murdered her husband.
 Depraved, St. Martin's Press, 2005 about John Edward Robinson
 One Deadly Night, St. Martin's Press, 2005 about David Camm
 Never Leave Me, St. Martin's Press, 2006 about the murder of Michelle Nyce by her husband.
 The Doctor's Wife, St. Martin's Press, 2007 about the murder of Jennifer Corbin by her husband.
 Forgive Me, Father, St. Martin's Press, 2008 about the Murder of Margaret Ann Pahl
 To Have and to Kill, St. Martin's Press, 2008 about Melanie McGuire
 Secrets in the Cellar, St. Martin's Press, 2009 about the Fritzl case
 Lost and Found, St. Martin's Press, 2010 about the kidnapping of Jaycee Dugard
 Playing with Fire, St. Martin's Press, 2010 about the murder of Jimmy Michael by his wife Shelly.
 Love Her to Death, St. Martin's Press, 2012 about Darren Mack
 The Prince of Paradise: The True Story of a Hotel Heir, His Seductive Wife, and a Ruthless Murder, St. Martin's Press, 2013 about the Murders of Bernice and Ben Novack Jr.
 The Lost Girls, St. Martin's Press, 2015 about the Ariel Castro kidnappings
My Sweet Angel, St. Martin's Press, 2016 about the Murder of Garnett Spears
The Family Next Door, St. Martin's Press, 2019 about the Turpin case
 The Perfect Father: The True Story of Chris Watts, His All-American Family, and a Shocking Murder, St. Martin's Press, 2020 about the Watts family murders
Golden Boy: A Murder Among the Manhattan Elite, St. Martin's Press, 2021 about Thomas Gilbert Jr.
The Doomsday Mother: Lori Vallow, Chad Daybell, and the End of an American Family, St. Martin's Press, 2022 about Lori Vallow and Chad Daybell

References

External links
 
 Publisher's author page

Living people
American crime writers
Year of birth missing (living people)